Peneroplis is an extant genus of benthic Foraminifera in the family Peneroplidae. The genus is also represented in the fossil record.

Peneroplis dwell in upper photic zone. They favour tropical to temperate shallow marine environments, feeding on diatoms

See also 
 List of prehistoric foraminifera genera

References 

Tubothalamea
Foraminifera genera